The Antos truck is a commercial vehicle manufactured by Daimler Truck. The Antos together with Arocs succeeded Axor. It was announced in May 2012 with a formal launch scheduled for September 2012.

References

External links

Antos
Vehicles introduced in 2012